Natalia Maliszewska (born 16 September 1995) is a Polish short track speed skater. She won silver medal at the 2018 World Short Track Speed Skating Championships and gold medal at the 2019 European Short Track Speed Skating Championships.

Career
She started her career in short track speed skating in 2007.  She made her debut in the 2012-13 ISU Short Track Speed Skating World Cup. In 2015, she became the first short track skater representing Poland to finish on the podium at a World Cup event when she placed second in the 500m in Montreal, Canada. 

She competed in the women's 500 metres at the 2018 Winter Olympics. She won a silver medal in the 500 metres event at the 2018 World Short Track Speed Skating Championships held in Montreal. In 2019, she won a gold medal at the European Short Track Speed Skating Championships in Dordrecht in the 500 metre event. 

She ended the 2018-19 ISU Short Track Speed Skating World Cup season by winning the general classification and becoming the 500 meter World Cup Champion. At the 2021 European Short Track Speed Skating Championships in Gdańsk she won silver medal in the 500 meters. At the 2022 Winter Olympics she was among the favourites to win an Olympic medal in the Women's 500 m event but was unable to compete as she tested positive for COVID-19 shortly after her arrival in Beijing.

Personal life
Her older sister Patrycja Maliszewska is also short track speed skater.

See also
 Sport in Poland
 List of Poles

References

External links
 
ISU profile

1995 births
Living people
Polish female short track speed skaters
Olympic short track speed skaters of Poland
Short track speed skaters at the 2018 Winter Olympics
Short track speed skaters at the 2022 Winter Olympics
World Short Track Speed Skating Championships medalists
Sportspeople from Białystok